fa: ثابت زمانی RC

The RC time constant, also called tau, the time constant (in seconds) of an RC circuit, is equal to the product of the circuit resistance (in ohms) and the circuit capacitance (in farads), i.e. 
 [seconds]

It is the time required to charge the capacitor, through the resistor, from an initial charge voltage of zero to approximately 63.2% of the value of an applied DC voltage, or to discharge the capacitor through the same resistor to approximately 36.8% of its initial charge voltage. The following formulae use it, assuming a constant voltage applied across the capacitor and resistor in series, to determine the voltage across the capacitor against time:

Cutoff frequency
The time constant  is related to the cutoff frequency fc, an alternative parameter of the RC circuit, by

or, equivalently,

where resistance in ohms and capacitance in farads yields the time constant in seconds or the cutoff frequency in Hz.

Short conditional equations using the value for :
fc in Hz = 159155 / τ in µs
τ in µs = 159155 / fc in Hz

Other useful equations are:
rise time (20% to 80%) 
rise time (10% to 90%) 

In more complicated circuits consisting of more than one resistor and/or capacitor, the open-circuit time constant method provides a way of approximating the cutoff frequency by computing a sum of several RC time constants.

Delay

The signal delay of a wire or other circuit, measured as group delay or phase delay or the effective propagation delay of a digital transition, may be dominated by resistive-capacitive effects, depending on the distance and other parameters, or may alternatively be dominated by inductive, wave, and speed of light effects in other realms.

Resistive-capacitive delay, or RC delay, hinders the further increasing of speed in microelectronic integrated circuits. When the feature size becomes smaller and smaller to increase the clock speed, the RC delay plays an increasingly important role. This delay can be reduced by replacing the aluminum conducting wire by copper, thus reducing the resistance; it can also be reduced by changing the interlayer dielectric (typically silicon dioxide) to low-dielectric-constant materials, thus reducing the capacitance.

The typical digital propagation delay of a resistive wire is about half of R times C; since both R and C are proportional to wire length, the delay scales as the square of wire length.  Charge spreads by diffusion in such a wire, as explained by Lord Kelvin in the mid nineteenth century.  Until Heaviside discovered that Maxwell's equations imply wave propagation when sufficient inductance is in the circuit, this square diffusion relationship was thought to provide a fundamental limit to the improvement of long-distance telegraph cables.  That old analysis was superseded in the telegraph domain, but remains relevant for long on-chip interconnects.

See also
 Cutoff frequency and frequency response
 Emphasis, preemphasis, deemphasis
 Exponential decay
 Filter (signal processing) and transfer function
 High-pass filter, low-pass filter, band-pass filter
 RL circuit, and RLC circuit
 Rise time

References

External links
RC Time Constant Calculator
Conversion time constant  to cutoff frequency fc and back
RC time constant

Analog circuits